Army Navy is an American indie rock group from Los Angeles, California, consisting of Justin Kennedy, Louie Schultz and Douglas Randall.

History
Their debut eponymous full-length album was released in 2008 on The Fever Zone records.

Besides their debut album, Army Navy has also contributed music to the films Beastly and Nick and Norah's Infinite Playlist.

Their second and third full-length albums, The Last Place and The Wilderness Inside, were released on July 12, 2011 and July 15, 2014 respectively.

Members
Justin Kennedy - Lead vocals, Guitar
Louie Schultz - Lead guitar, Vocals
Douglas Randall - Drums, Vocals

Discography

Albums
Army Navy - 2008 (The Fever Zone)
The Last Place - 2011
The Wilderness Inside – July 15, 2014

References

Army Navy's Official Facebook
Myspace

External links
 Official Site 
 the mixtape chats with Army Navy

Indie rock musical groups from California
Musical groups from Los Angeles